Chrysendeton is a genus of moths of the family Crambidae described by Augustus Radcliffe Grote in 1881.

Species
Chrysendeton anicitalis (Schaus, 1924)
Chrysendeton autobella (Dyar, 1914)
Chrysendeton azadasalis (Schaus, 1924)
Chrysendeton bromachalis (Schaus, 1940)
Chrysendeton bronachalis (Schaus, 1924)
Chrysendeton chalcitis (C. Felder, R. Felder & Rogenhofer, 1875)
Chrysendeton claudialis (Walker, 1859)
Chrysendeton cumalis (Druce, 1896)
Chrysendeton divulsalis (Walker, 1866)
Chrysendeton imitabilis (Dyar, 1917)
Chrysendeton kimballi Lange, 1956
Chrysendeton mangholdalis (Schaus, 1924)
Chrysendeton medicinalis Grote, 1881
Chrysendeton melatornalis (Hampson, 1906)
Chrysendeton minimalis (Herrich-Schäffer, 1871)
Chrysendeton miralis (Möschler, 1890)
Chrysendeton nigrescens Heppner, 1991
Chrysendeton romanalis (Druce, 1896)
Chrysendeton tessellalis (Hampson, 1897)
Chrysendeton vacuolata (Dyar, 1914)

References

Acentropinae
Crambidae genera
Taxa named by Augustus Radcliffe Grote